Ananda Yoga, or Ananda Yoga for Higher Awareness is a system of Hatha Yoga established by Kriyananda, a Western disciple of Paramahansa Yogananda, and is based on Yogananda's Self-Realization Fellowship (SRF) and Yogoda Satsanga Society of India (YSS) teachings. Ananda Yoga emphasizes inner awareness; energy control; and the experience of each asana as a natural expression of a higher state of consciousness, which is enhanced by the use of affirmations.

History 

Ananda Yoga was established by Kriyananda taking from one of the oldest Hatha Yoga systems in the West. Its roots are the 1940s/1950s, when Kriyananda was with Self-Realization Fellowship, he was taught these postures by Yogananda.  Yogananda, founder of SRF and YSS, asked Kriyananda (then Donald Walters) and other young monks, to demonstrate the postures for visiting guests, as well as for public events, such as the SRF "Lake Shrine Dedication." Kriyananda and other monks also posed for photos, for articles on the yoga postures in Yogananda's "Self-Realization Magazine." From 1965 Kriyananda through his own organization started to teach Ananda Yoga publicly in California. The director of Ananda Yoga, Gyandev Rich McCord,  is a co-founder of Yoga Alliance and a member of its board of directors.

Principles 
Ananda Yoga uses asana and pranayama to awaken, experience, and control the subtle energies (prana) within the body, especially the energies of the chakras, supposed energy centres that are arranged along the spine. Its object is to use those energies to harmonize the body, uplift the mind, and above all to attune to higher levels of awareness. A unique feature of this system is the use of silent affirmations while in the asanas, as a means of working more consciously with the subtle energies to achieve this attunement. Ananda Yoga is a relatively inward experience, not an athletic practice. A main goal is to prepare for deep meditation, as Hatha Yoga is considered the physical branch of Raja Yoga in both the Hatha Yoga Pradipika and the Gheranda Samhita.

Energization exercises 

The "Energization Exercises", a vital part of Ananda Yoga, are Yogananda's contribution to yoga. He first developed them in 1916, within his organization then called Yogoda, which he changed to Self-Realization Fellowship / Yogoda Satsanga Society of India in the 1930s. He eventually expanded them into a set of 39 exercises. The goal is to tap into cosmic energy, recharging the whole body. Yogananda explains in his Autobiography of a Yogi: "Realizing that man's body is like an electric battery, I reasoned that it could be recharged with energy through the direct agency of the human will…. I therefore taught the Ranchi students my simple 'Yogoda' techniques by which the life force, centered in man’s medulla oblongata, can be consciously and instantly recharged from the unlimited supply of cosmic energy."

References

Modern Denominational Yoga
Meditation
Yoga styles